Ian Foreman (11 October 1930 – 7 January 2021) was an Australian rules footballer who played with Footscray in the Victorian Football League (VFL).

Notes

External links 
		

1930 births
Australian rules footballers from Victoria (Australia)
Western Bulldogs players
Braybrook Football Club players
2021 deaths